Uniquely Mancini: The Big Band Sound of Henry Mancini is an album by Henry Mancini and His Orchestra. It was released in 1963 on RCA Victor (catalog no. LSP-2692).

It entered Billboard magazine's pop album chart on July 6, 1963, peaked at No. 5, and remained on the chart for 11 weeks. AllMusic gave the album a rating of three-and-a-half stars.

Track listing 
Side A
 "Green Onions" (Booker T. Jones, Steve Cropper, Al Jackson Jr., Lewie Steinberg)
 "Stairway to the Stars" (Mitchell Parish, Matty Malneck, Frank Signorelli)
 "Night Train" (Oscar Washington, Lewis Simpkins, Jimmy Forrest)
 "Lullaby of Birdland" (George Shearing, B.Y. Forster)
 "Chelsea Bridge" (Billy Strayhorn)
 "C Jam Blues" (Duke Ellington)

Side B
 "Banzai Pipeline" (Henry Mancini)
 "Rhapsody in Blue" (George Gershwin)
 "Cheers!" (Henry Mancini)
 "Lonesome" (Henry Mancini)
 "The Hot Canary" (Paul Nero)
 "Moonlight Serenade" (Mitchell Parish, Glenn Miller)

Personnel
Conrad Gozzo (lead), Frank Beach, Ray Triscari, Pete Candoli (soloist), Conte Candoli (soloist), Don Fagerquist (flugelhorn soloist) - trumpet
Dick Nash (soloist), Jimmy Priddy, John Halliburton, George Roberts (bass trombone) - trombone
Vincent DeRosa (soloist), Richard Perissi, John Cave, Art Maebe - French horn
Ted Nash (alto saxophone and alto flute solo), Ronny Lang (alto flute soloist), Harry Klee, Gene Cipriano, Plas Johnson (tenor saxophone soloist) - woodwind
Jack Sperling - drums
Rolly Bundock - bass
Bob Bain - guitar
Jimmy Rowles - piano
Larry Bunker - vibraphone, marimba
Bobby Helfer - orchestra manager

References

Henry Mancini albums
1963 albums
RCA Victor albums